Karula National Park is national park in southern Estonia. It was established in 1979 as a protected area and in 1993 became a national park. It is the smallest national park in Estonia.

The park is located in Antsla and Rõuge parishes in Võru County and Valga Parish in Valga County. The park covers almost a third of the Karula Uplands and is characterised by its hilly topography, its many lakes, the great biodiversity and traditional cultural landscape. The flora of the national park is rich, and includes several species red-listed in Estonia such as the Baltic orchid, mezereon and the daisyleaf grape fern; the latter is only found in three locations in Estonia and Karula is one of them. The fauna also incorporates unusual and threatened species, such as the pond bat, the lesser spotted eagle and the black stork. Mammals like elk, lynx and polecat are common.

See also
 Protected areas of Estonia
 List of national parks in the Baltics

References

External links
 
 
 Karula National Park

National parks of Estonia
Protected areas established in 1979
1979 establishments in Estonia
Antsla Parish
Rõuge Parish
Valga Parish
Geography of Võru County
Geography of Valga County
Tourist attractions in Võru County
Tourist attractions in Valga County